Empty Yard Experiment (or EYE for short) is a progressive rock band. Founded in 2006, EYE has created a reputation for its live shows, where the band's music is complemented by the use of conceptual and visual art. The band's music often eludes categorization with its unique blend of Western musical traditions and those inspired by the various cultures of the Middle East. It incorporates various elements of Post-Rock and Alternative Rock to place the band as one of the most prominent progressive rock acts in the region. EYE's live shows relied heavily on visuals created by the band, drummer Sami Al Turki and Altamash Urooj which allows the band to offer their audience a "multi-sensory experience", used as a distinctive platform for communication with the audience.

EYE released a self-titled EP in 2011 and in 2014, the band released the critically acclaimed 'Kallisti', which was hailed by Metal Hammer magazine as a "sweeping, epic, multi-faceted piece that takes its listener on a journey that very few other bands are able to."

In 2013, EYE opened the show for Metallica at Abu Dhabi's Yas Island Du Arena., and has also opened for other iconic international acts such as Evanescence and Anathema.

Discography
Studio albums
 Empty Yard Experiment EP (2011)
 Kallisti (2014)

Singles
 GHHR (2013)
 The Passage (2017)

Band members
Current members
 Bojan Preradovic – Vocals, Rhythm Guitar (2010–present)
 Mehdi Gorjestani – Guitars (2006–present)

Session members
 Jay Postones – Drums (2018)
 Dale Gorham – Bass (2018)
 Munsef Turkmani – Bass (2017)
 Athena Ekhteraei – Guitars, Bass (2015–present)
 Manu Anand – Vocals, Guitars (2010–2015)
 Greg Cargopoulos – Drums (2013)

Former members
 Sami Al-Turki – Drums (2006–2010, 2016–2017)
 Kaveh Kashani – Bass (2006–2016)
 Gorgin Asadi – Keyboards, Synthesizers (2006–2016)
 Josh Saldanha – Drums (2013–2016)
 Sasan Sam Nasernia – Drums (2010–2012)

References

External links

Progressive rock groups
Experimental musical groups
Psychedelic rock music groups
Musical groups established in 2006
Post-rock groups
Musical groups from Dubai